Wilfrid George Barker  (19 June 1907 – 21 January 1988) was an Australian politician.

He was born in Launceston. In 1964 he was elected to the Tasmanian House of Assembly as a Liberal member for Braddon. He held the seat until his retirement in 1976. He was awarded the CBE in 1986.

References

1907 births
1988 deaths
Liberal Party of Australia members of the Parliament of Tasmania
Members of the Tasmanian House of Assembly
Commanders of the Order of the British Empire
20th-century Australian politicians